Air Song is the debut album by the improvisational collective Air featuring Henry Threadgill, Steve McCall, and Fred Hopkins performing four of Threadgill's compositions. The album was originally released on the Japanese Why Not label in 1975 and later released in the U.S. on India Navigation in 1982.

Reception
The Penguin Guide to Jazz selected this album as part of its suggested Core Collection, stating: "Air Song was the first release and still stands up well, four longish compositions by Threadgill whose quirky deployment of minimal themes and areas of activity gave the trio plenty to work with".

The Allmusic review by Thom Jurek commented: "The interplay between the three members is almost always inventive, engaging, and full of warmth and humor. There is little excessive indulgence to be found on these improvisations, and the degree of musicianship with these men is off the chart... A lovely and auspicious debut".

Track listing
All compositions by Henry Threadgill
 "Untitled Tango" – 12:08
 "Great Body of the Riddle or Where Were the Dodge Boys When My Clay Started to Slide" – 13:29
 "Dance of the Beast" – 11:03
 "Air Song" – 12:17
 Recorded at P.S. Recording Studios, Chicago on September 10, 1975

Personnel
Henry Threadgill – tenor saxophone (track 1), baritone saxophone (track 2), alto saxophone (track 3), flute (track 4)
Fred Hopkins – bass
Steve McCall – drums

References

1975 debut albums
Air (free jazz trio) albums
India Navigation albums
Whynot Records albums